Venus with a Satyr and Two Cupids or The Bacchante (La Baccante) is a 1588-1590 oil on canvas painting by Annibale Carracci, now in the Uffizi in Florence. Its dating is based on its strong Venetian influence - the artist was briefly in the city at the end of the 1580s.

The work is first recorded in 1620, when the Bolognese gentleman Camillo Bolognetti sold it to an emissary from Cosimo II de' Medici, Grand Duke of Tuscany. It was then taken to Florence and remained in the Medici collections, displayed in the Tribuna of the Uffizi and appearing in the top left of Johann Zoffany's painting of the same name beside Guido Reni's Charity and directly above Raphael's Madonna della Seggiola. It was covered by another canvas during the 18th century due to its erotic charge, only removed early in the 19th century.

Gallery

References

Mythological paintings by Annibale Carracci
Paintings of Venus
Paintings in the collection of the Uffizi
1590 paintings
Nude art